Cosenza Calcio S.r.l. is an Italian football club, based in Cosenza, Calabria.

Found in 2011 as Nuova Cosenza Calcio as the phoenix club of Cosenza Calcio 1914 S.r.l., the spiritual successor of the original Cosenza Calcio 1914 S.p.A. which folded in 2005.

History

Cosenza Calcio 1914

The club was founded on 18 November 1912 as "Società Sportiva Fortitudo" (the year 1914 is a reference to the first historic match played by the club on 23 February 1914) and enjoyed a long time in the professional leagues, spending several years in the Serie B. They also won the Anglo-Italian Cup in 1983. In 2003, Cosenza 1914 was expelled from professional league.

In 2003 an illegitimate phoenix club was found as A.S. Cosenza F.C.. In 2004, old Cosenza won the appeal and was admitted to 2004–05 Serie D. Thus that season there was a derby. In 2005 new Cosenza switched its denomination into A.S. Cosenza Calcio, after the fall of old Cosenza.

Cosenza Calcio 1914 Srl

In 2007, A.S. Cosenza Calcio gave up its Serie D membership, but all the team players later joined new club Fortitudo Cosenza, born as relocation of Rende Calcio, a team from the neighbouring city of Rende which was relegated to Serie D in 2006–07 season and moved to Cosenza soon after. The new club quickly managed to win the Serie D/Girone I championship in 2007–08, ensuring a place back into the Lega Pro Seconda Divisione (the renamed Serie C2) for the 2008–09 season.

Three seasons in professionalism
Following this, the new club renamed itself, taking the old historical denomination of Cosenza Calcio 1914 S.r.l. with the aim to rise up the Italian football pyramid. In 2008–09, their first season in the Lega Pro, Cosenza showed all of their intentions by winning the Lega Pro Seconda Divisione/Girone C championship. The team played the 2009–10 season in the Lega Pro Prima Divisione/Girone B, finishing 11th in the table.

At the end of the 2010–11 Lega Pro Prima Divisione season the team was relegated after losing the playoff. The team was then excluded from professional Championship by Co.Vi.So.C. of Italian Football Federation and it didn't appeal.

During the professional seasons, former chairman Damiano Paletta was suspended in June 2009 for 6 months for irregularities in administration. The ban was reduced after an appeal.

For the bankruptcy of Cosenza Calcio 1914 S.r.l., former managers Eugenio Funari, Paolo Pagliuso (former chairman) and his son Luca Pagliuso, Giuseppe Citrigno and Francesco Iannucci were banned from football for 2 years to 5 years. due to irregularities in management.

In 2013 the membership of Cosenza Calcio 1914 S.r.l. was finally revoked.

Nuova Cosenza Calcio
In mid-2011 the club was refounded as Nuova Cosenza Calcio and restarted from Serie D After a mediocre start, they sacked coach Enzo Patania and hired Tommaso Napoli. They won nine and drew seven without a loss to finish the regular season in second place to HinterReggio in Group I and entered in the promotion playoffs. They won six in a row to become champions of the playoffs. The club won the promotion playoffs by beating SandonàJesoloCalcio 3–2 in the final, but not being automatically promoted shall remain still in Serie D.

On 5 August 2013, the team announced that it was promoted to the professional league, Lega Pro Seconda Divisione. Circa 2013 the club refer itself simply as Cosenza Calcio, a name change in Italian Chamber of Commerce was done some time later.

Cosenza was promoted again to the unified 2014–15 Lega Pro after ending the 2013–14 Lega Pro Seconda Divisione season in fourth place. The team mathematically secured the promotion in March 2014.

In 2018, Cosenza promoted to Serie B.

Colors and badge
The team's official colours are red and dark blue, probably in honor to Genoa C.F.C.

Players

First-team squad

Out on loan

Coaching staff

Honours
Coppa Italia Lega Pro: 2014–15
Serie D: 1958–59

References

External links
Official website

 
Football clubs in Calabria
Serie B clubs
Serie C clubs
Serie D clubs
Phoenix clubs (association football)
Association football clubs established in 1914
Association football clubs established in 2003
Association football clubs established in 2007
Association football clubs established in 2011
1914 establishments in Italy
Coppa Italia Serie C winning clubs